The 1999 Ontario general election was held on June 3, 1999 to elect members of the 37th Legislative Assembly of the Province of Ontario, Canada.

The governing Progressive Conservative Party of Ontario, led by Premier Mike Harris, was re-elected to a second majority government.

It was the first election in which the Legislative Assembly of Ontario had a reduced number of seats. Previously, the province's riding boundaries were different from those used in federal elections. In the 1999 election, for the first time, provincial riding boundaries were redrawn to precisely match federal ridings, resulting in 27 fewer seats — and 27 fewer Members of Provincial Parliament — in the legislature. Notably, in a number of ridings this resulted in incumbent MPPs directly facing each other in the new seats; in a few ridings, incumbent MPPs from the same party even had to compete against each other for their own party's nomination.

Campaign

According to a poll released on the eve of the election, the Liberal Party entered the campaign with a lead over the Progressive Conservatives.  This poll's accuracy was disputed by many, however, and even Liberal leader Dalton McGuinty cast doubt on it: noting that most polling companies claim to be accurate 19 times out of 20, he suggested that this might have been the 20th. Subsequent polls taken in the early period of the campaign showed the Progressive Conservatives with a commanding lead over the Liberals, in a manner more consistent with pre-election numbers.

Harris' government had delivered large tax cuts and significantly reduced the deficit, but they had also severely cut spending in the process. They had the support of the legendary Tory political machine, bolstered by a group of American experts imported from the United States' Republican Party.  They targeted Dalton McGuinty as inexperienced ("Dalton McGuinty is not up to the job" was a Tory campaign slogan), and attacked him for lacking a clear vision. This was successful due to McGuinty having a reputation for being uncomfortable and stiff in the media. During the leader's debates, McGuinty had a poor performance, being unable to explain his party's platform clearly and being compared to fictional serial killer Norman Bates by NDP leader Howard Hampton.

The extensive use of attack ads and wedge issues by the Tories was a new development in Canadian politics, and some commentators worried the election process was becoming Americanized.

The third major party, the Ontario New Democratic Party led by Howard Hampton, spent much the campaign battling the memory of Bob Rae's unpopular government in the early 1990s. Despite Hampton's efforts to reach out to labour, the NDP were substantially weakened as the major unions deserted them in favour of the Liberals, hoping to defeat the Tories by strategic voting.

The province was enjoying strong economic growth at the time which also vindicated the Conservatives' deficit-cutting measures in the public. The Liberal Party managed to recover some support late in the campaign, but it was not enough and the Tories were re-elected with a second consecutive majority government.

Results

Notes: 

No fewer than 27 candidates affiliated with the Communist Party of Canada - Marxist-Leninist contested this election as independents.  These candidates won a total of 7,194 votes.
 The Reform Association of Ontario fielded one candidate.
 Three independent candidates were members of the Humanist Party of Ontario.
It is possible that some independent candidates were actually members of these or other unregistered parties.

Constituency results
Expenditure entries are taken from official candidate reports as listed by Elections Ontario.  The figures cited are the "Total Candidate's Campaign Expenses Subject to Limitation", and include transfers from constituency associations.

The official returns list Ray as a candidate of the Ontario Communist Party, rather than the Communist League.  This, however, is an error.

Ottawa-Carleton

|-
|bgcolor=whitesmoke|Carleton—Gloucester
||
|Brian Coburn24,356
|
|Rene Danis18,052
|
|Jamie Gallant1,195
|
|Richard Wolfson 177
|
|Andre Clermont614
|
|  Luc Brisebois (Ind)247  
||
|Gilles Morin † Carleton East
|-
|bgcolor=whitesmoke|Nepean—Carleton
||
|John Baird  31,546
|
|Gord Hunter 16,809
|
|Craig Parsons  1,647
|
|
|
|Brian E. Jackson239
|
|Bill Frampton (F)386 
||
|John Baird Nepean
|-
|bgcolor=whitesmoke|Ottawa Centre
|    
|Ray Kostuck15,403
||
|Richard Patten17,956
|
|Elisabeth Arnold11,977
|
|Wayne Foster 170 
|
|Chris Bradshaw 1,231
|
| Marvin Glass (Comm)174Mistahi Corkill (Ind [M-L])132 
||
|Richard Patten
|-
|bgcolor=whitesmoke|Ottawa South
|
|Mike Nicholson19,337
||
|Dalton McGuinty22,707
|
|James McLaren2,655
|
|James Hea 121
|
|George Brown 724
|
| Mag Carson (Ind [M-L])243 
||
|Dalton McGuinty
|-
|bgcolor=whitesmoke|Ottawa—Vanier
|
|Maurice Lamirande12,605
||
|Claudette Boyer21,009
|
|David Gagnon4,163
|
|Pierrette Blondin 580
|
|Richard Briggs 953 
|
| Kevin Corkill (Ind [M-L])310
||
|Bernard Grandmaître † Ottawa East
|-
|rowspan=3 bgcolor=whitesmoke|Ottawa West—Nepean
|rowspan=3 |
|rowspan=3|Garry Guzzo22,834
|rowspan=3|
|rowspan=3|Rick Chiarelli16,419
|rowspan=3|
|rowspan=3|Alex Cullen7,701
|rowspan=3|
|rowspan=3|Lester Newby 70
|rowspan=3|
|rowspan=3|Richard Warman 453 
|rowspan=3|
|rowspan=3| Megan Hnatiw (Ind [M-L])129  John Turmel(Ind) 94  Anthony Silvestro (CoR)79 
||
|Garry Guzzo Ottawa—Rideau
|-
|colspan=2 bgcolor=whitesmoke align=center|Merged riding
|-
||
|Alex Cullen Ottawa West

Eastern Ontario

|-
|bgcolor=whitesmoke|Glengarry—Prescott—Russell
|
|Alain Lalonde17,364
||
|Jean-Marc Lalonde24,568
|
|Stephane Landry2,007
|
|Mary Glasser 425
|
|
|
|
||
|Jean-Marc LalondePrescott and Russell
|-
|rowspan=3 bgcolor=whitesmoke|Hastings—Frontenac—Lennox and Addington
|rowspan=3|    
|rowspan=3|Harry Danford18,553
|rowspan=3 |
|rowspan=3|Leona Dombrowsky20,395
|rowspan=3|
|rowspan=3|Allan McPhail3,008
|rowspan=3|
|rowspan=3|
|rowspan=3|
|rowspan=3|
|rowspan=3|
|rowspan=3|
||
|Harry DanfordHastings—Peterborough
|-
|colspan=2 bgcolor=whitesmoke align=center|Merged riding
|-
||
|Bill Vankoughnet † Frontenac—Addington
|-
|bgcolor=whitesmoke|Kingston and the Islands 
|
|Bob Pickering14,487
||
|John Gerretsen26,355
|
|Beth Pater5,436
|
|Gerard Morris 182
|
|Chris Walker 1,174
|
|Chris Beneteau (FCP)546
||
|John Gerretsen
|-
|bgcolor=whitesmoke|Lanark—Carleton 
||
|Norm Sterling31,364
|
|Dwight Eastman17,323
|
|Sheila Sansome2,713
|
|Angela Hea 171
|
|Stuart Langstaff 681
|
|J.J. Campbell (FCP)1,450
||
|Norm Sterling Carleton
|-
|bgcolor=whitesmoke|Leeds—Grenville
||
|Bob Runciman23,390
|
|Don Cameron17,307
|
|Jim Murray2,097
|
|Britt Roberts 244
|
|Ken Blackburn 1,008
|
|
||
|Rob Runciman
|-
|rowspan=3 bgcolor=whitesmoke|Prince Edward-Hastings
|rowspan=3 |
|rowspan=3 |Gary Fox17,931
|rowspan=3 |
|rowspan=3 |Ernie Parsons17,987
|rowspan=3 |
|rowspan=3 |Bev Campbell2,877
|rowspan=3 |
|rowspan=3 |Sylvie Poirier 111
|rowspan=3 |
|rowspan=3 |Shawn Talbot441
|rowspan=3 |
|rowspan=3 |Marie Hineman (CoR)203Kevin River (Ind)188Trueman Tuck (Ind [Independent Reform])133
||
|Gary Fox Prince Edward—Lennox
|-
|colspan=2 bgcolor=whitesmoke align=center|Merged riding
|-
||
|Doug Rollins † Quinte
|-
|rowspan=3 bgcolor=whitesmoke|Renfrew—Nipissing—Pembroke
|rowspan=3|
|rowspan=3|Leo Jordan17,738
|rowspan=3 |
|rowspan=3|Sean Conway23,435
|rowspan=3|
|rowspan=3|Gerry Boyer2,295
|rowspan=3|
|rowspan=3|Andre Giordano 172
|rowspan=3|
|rowspan=3|Thane Heins 287
|rowspan=3|
|rowspan=3|
||
|Leo JordanLanark—Renfrew
|-
|colspan=2 bgcolor=whitesmoke align=center|Merged riding
|-
||
|Sean ConwayRenfrew North
|-
|rowspan=3 bgcolor=whitesmoke|Stormont—Dundas—Charlottenburgh
|rowspan=3|
|rowspan=3|Noble Villeneuve19,635
|rowspan=3 |
|rowspan=3|John Cleary20,275
|rowspan=3|
|rowspan=3|Maggie MacDonald2,012
|rowspan=3|
|rowspan=3|Ian Campbell 329
|rowspan=3|
|rowspan=3|
|rowspan=3|
|rowspan=3|
||
|Noble VilleneuveStormont—Dundas—Glengarry and East Grenville
|-
|colspan=2 bgcolor=whitesmoke align=center|Merged riding
|-
||
|John ClearyCornwall

Central Ontario

|-
|bgcolor=whitesmoke|Barrie—Simcoe—Bradford
||
|Joe Tascona33,721
|
|Maura Bolger15,376
|
|Jim Brooker2,532
|
|Mitchell Hibbs 229
|
|
|
|Walter Tracogna (Ind)482Rudy Couture (Ind)302
||
|Joe TasconaSimcoe Centre
|-
|bgcolor=whitesmoke|Bruce—Grey
||
|Bill Murdoch24,915
|
|Ruth Lovell16,139
|
|Colleen Purdon2,776
|
|
|
|Grant Pattullo 373
|
|John Clark (FCP)1540
||
|Bill MurdochGrey—Owen Sound
|-
|bgcolor=whitesmoke|Dufferin—Peel—Wellington—Grey
||
|David Tilson30,532
|
|Steve White13,591
|
|Noel Duignan1,871
|
|
|
|Richard Procter 1156
|
|
||
|David TilsonDufferin—Peel
|-
|bgcolor=whitesmoke|Durham
||
|John O'Toole26,103
|
|Garry Minnie14,694
|
|Jim Morrison4,235
|
|Jacinthe Millaire 242
|
|Gail Thompson 467
|
| 
||
|John O'TooleDurham East
|-
|bgcolor=whitesmoke|Haliburton—Victoria—Brock
||
|Chris Hodgson32,125
|
|Sharon McCrae14,556
|
|Rick Denyer3,786
|
|Maxim Newby 135
|
|
|
|Brad Bradamore (Ind)340Charles Olito (F)198
||
|Chris HodgsonVictoria—Haliburton
|-
|bgcolor=whitesmoke|Northumberland
||
|Doug Galt20,535
|
|Carolyn Campbell19,632
|
|Murray Weppler2,820
|
|Pascale Levert 99
|
|Tom Lawson 1,194
|
|Jim Psihogios (FCP)370
||
|Doug Galt
|-
|bgcolor=whitesmoke|Peterborough
||
|Gary Stewart24,422
|
|Jeff Leal21,820
|
|Dave Nickle7,058
|
|Larry Tyldsley 598
|
|Robert Mayer 106
|
|Bob Bowers (Ind)151K.T. Burgess (Ind)125
||
|Gary Stewart
|-
|bgcolor=whitesmoke|Simcoe—Grey
||
|Jim Wilson31,984
|
|Norman Sandberg12,815
|
|Mary Hart3,662
|
|
|
|
|
|
||
|Jim WilsonSimcoe West
|-
|bgcolor=whitesmoke|Simcoe North
||
|Garfield Dunlop 26,160
|
|George MacDonald19,209
|
|Ann Billings2,913
|
|William Ayling 305
|
|Harry Promm 633
|
|
||
|Al McLean†Simcoe East
|-
|rowspan=3 bgcolor=whitesmoke|York North
|rowspan=3 |
|rowspan=3|Julia Munro29,613
|rowspan=3|
|rowspan=3|John Volpe15,755
|rowspan=3|
|rowspan=3|Steve Saysell2,236
|rowspan=3|
|rowspan=3|Kwok-Lin Mary Wan305
|rowspan=3|
|rowspan=3|
|rowspan=3|
|rowspan=3|
||
|Julia MunroDurham—York
|-
|colspan=2 bgcolor=whitesmoke align=center|Merged riding
|-
||
|Frank Klees‡York—Mackenzie

Southern Durham & York

|-
|bgcolor=whitesmoke|Markham
||
|David Tsubouchi26,083
|
|Steven Kirsch12,859
|
|Janice Hagan1,594
|
|Bernadette Manning 437
|
|Pat Redmond (FCP)399
||
|David Tsubouchi
|-
|bgcolor=whitesmoke|Oak Ridges
||
|Frank Klees30,432
|
|Vito Spatafora17,427
|
|Chris Moise1,957
|
|Steven Haylestrom 914
|
|
|colspan="2" style="text-align:center;"|New District
|-
|bgcolor=whitesmoke|Oshawa
||
|Jerry Ouellette18,915
|
|Chris Topple11,740
|
|Colleen Twomey9,154
|
|
|
|Garry Kotack (NLP)651
||
|Jerry Oullette
|-
|bgcolor=whitesmoke|Pickering—Ajax—Uxbridge
||
|Janet Ecker28,661
|
|Dave Ryan16,881
|
|Jim Wiseman2,814
|
|Chris Pennington 703
|
|Bob Riaz (NLP)191
||
|Janet EckerDurham West
|-
|bgcolor=whitesmoke|Thornhill
||
|Tina Molinari19,580
|
|Dan Ronen19,237
|
|Nathan Rotman1,438
|
|Ruth Van Bezold 360
|
|
|colspan="2" style="text-align:center;"|New District
|-
|bgcolor=whitesmoke|Vaughan—King—Aurora
||
|Al Palladini28,836
|
|Tony Genco21,173
|
|Michael Seaward1,539
|
|Ernst Von Bezold 495
|
|John Genser (Lbt)670
||
|Al PalladiniYork Centre
|-
|bgcolor=whitesmoke|Whitby—Ajax
||
|Jim Flaherty27,623
|
|Aldo Digiovanni16,235
|
|Betty Craig3,889
|
|
|
|
||
|Jim FlahertyDurham Centre

Central Toronto

|-
|rowspan="3" bgcolor=whitesmoke|Beaches—East York
|rowspan="3"|
|rowspan="3"|Judy Burns12,776
|rowspan="3"|
|rowspan="3"|Bill Buckingham9,332
|rowspan="3" |
|rowspan="3"|Frances Lankin19,703
|rowspan="3"|
|rowspan="3"|Dan Largy 264
|rowspan="3"|
|rowspan="3"|Donalda Fredeen 230
|rowspan="3"|
|rowspan="3"|Michael Schulman 431 
|rowspan="3"|
|rowspan="3"|Steve Rutchinski (Ind [M-L])164
||
|Frances LankinBeaches—Woodbine
|-
|colspan=2 bgcolor=whitesmoke align=center|Merged riding
|-
||
|John Parker‡York East
|-
|bgcolor=whitesmoke|Broadview—Greenwood
|
|Rita Smith9,554
|
|Julie Wang Morris9,553
||
|Marilyn Churley18,150
|
|Tony Ieraci 320
|
|Bob Hyman 565
|
|
|
|Melanie Cishecki (Ind [M-L])543
||
|Marilyn ChurleyRiverdale
|-
|rowspan="3" bgcolor=whitesmoke|Davenport
|rowspan="3"|
|rowspan="3"|Eduardo Marcos4,346
|rowspan="3" |
|rowspan="3"|Tony Ruprecht13,649
|rowspan="3"|
|rowspan="3"|Tony Silipo8,717
|rowspan="3"|
|rowspan="3"|
|rowspan="3"|
|rowspan="3"|Maurice Seguin 81
|rowspan="3"|
|rowspan="3"|Paulo Simas 22
|rowspan="3"|
|rowspan="3"|Ken Kalopsis (R)174Barbara Seed (Ind [M-L])164Nunzio Venuto (Lbt)95 
||
|Tony RuprechtParkdale
|-
|colspan=2 bgcolor=whitesmoke align=center|Merged riding
|-
||
|Tony SilipoDovercourt
|-
|bgcolor=whitesmoke|Don Valley West
||
|David Turnbull23,177
|
|Paul Davidson20,008
|
|Geoffrey Allen2,152
|
|
|
|Debbie Weberg 224
|
|
|
|Judith Snow (Ind [M-L])312
||
|David TurnbullYork Mills
|-
|bgcolor=whitesmoke|Eglinton—Lawrence
|
|John Parker14,994
||
|Mike Colle24,151
|
|Jay Waterman1,835
|
|Frank D'Angelo 821 
|
|Neil Dickie 263
|
|Shelly Lipsey 470
|
|
||
|Mike ColleOakwood
|-
|rowspan="3" bgcolor=whitesmoke|Parkdale—High Park
|rowspan="3"|
|rowspan="3"|Annamarie Castrilli12,647
|rowspan="3" |
|rowspan="3"|Gerard Kennedy23,022
|rowspan="3"|
|rowspan="3"|Irene Atkinson4,937
|rowspan="3"|
|rowspan="3"|Stan Grzywna 289
|rowspan="3"|
|rowspan="3"|Lynne Hea 99
|rowspan="3"|
|rowspan="3"|Frank de Jong500
|rowspan="3"|
|rowspan="3"|Doug Burn (Lbt)325Jorge Van Schouwen (Ind [Humanist])99
||
|Gerard KennedyYork South
|-
|colspan=2 bgcolor=whitesmoke align=center|Merged riding
|-
||
|Derwyn Shea†High Park—Swansea
|-
|rowspan="3" bgcolor=whitesmoke|St. Paul's
|rowspan="3"|
|rowspan="3"|Isabel Bassett18,973
|rowspan="3" |
|rowspan="3"|Michael Bryant23,755
|rowspan="3"|
|rowspan="3"|Larry Solway3,350
|rowspan="3"|
|rowspan="3"|
|rowspan="3"|
|rowspan="3"|Linda Martin 188
|rowspan="3"|
|rowspan="3"|Don Roebuck 326
|rowspan="3"|
|rowspan="3"|Philip Fernandez (Ind [M-L])194Antonio Maristanes (Ind)184
||
|Isabel BassettSt. Andrew—St. Patrick
|-
|colspan=2 bgcolor=whitesmoke align=center|Merged riding
|-
||
|Bill Saunderson†Eglinton
|-
|bgcolor=whitesmoke|Toronto Centre—Rosedale
|
|Durhane Wong-Rieger13,640
||
|George Smitherman17,756
|
|Helen Breslauer4,019
|
|Bill Whatcott 232
|
|Ron Parker 205
|
|Joseph Cohen392
|
|John Sewell (Ind)8822Paul McKeever (F)344Mike Ryner (Ind)236
||
|Al Leach†St. George—St. David
|-
|bgcolor=whitesmoke|Trinity—Spadina
|
|Chris Loreto7,323
|
|Albert Koehl9,817
||
|Rosario Marchese17,110
|
|
|
|Ron Robins 274
|
|Sat Khalsa 612
|
|Roberto Verdecchia (Ind [Humanist])258Silvio Ursomarzo (F)182Raymond Samuels (Ind)154
||
|Rosario MarcheseFort York
|-
|bgcolor=whitesmoke|York South—Weston
|
|Alan Hofmeister7,471
||
|Joe Cordiano18,205
|
|Rosana Pellizzari6,850
|
|Enzo Granzotto 542
|
|Erica Kindl 139
|
|Alma Subasic 147
|
|David Gershuny (Ind [M-L])486Hassan Husseini (Comm)261
||
|Joe CordianoLawrence

Suburban Toronto

|-
|rowspan=3 bgcolor=whitesmoke|Don Valley East
|rowspan=3|
|rowspan=3|David Johnson17,955
|rowspan=3 |
|rowspan=3|David Caplan20,993
|rowspan=3|
|rowspan=3|J. Bala Krishnan1,822
|rowspan=3|
|rowspan=3|Ryan Kidd 153
|rowspan=3|
|rowspan=3|Shail Lall28
|rowspan=3|
|rowspan=3|Jeff Pancer85
|rowspan=3|
|rowspan=3|
Raffi Assadourian (Ind)329Elizabeth Rowley (Comm)91Fernand Deschamps (Ind [M-L])65Wayne Simmons (F)53
||
|David JohnsonDon Mills
|-
|colspan=2 bgcolor=whitesmoke align=center|Merged riding
|-
||
|David CaplanOriole
|-
|rowspan=3 bgcolor=whitesmoke|Etobicoke Centre
|rowspan=3 |
|rowspan=3 |Chris Stockwell25,518
|rowspan=3|
|rowspan=3|Agnes Ugolini Potts19,035
|rowspan=3|
|rowspan=3|Bonte Minnema1,309
|rowspan=3|
|rowspan=3|Dan McCash 389
|rowspan=3|
|rowspan=3|Geraldine Jackson 316
|rowspan=3|
|rowspan=3|Christopher Morton375 
|rowspan=3|
|rowspan=3| Elaine Couto (Ind [M-L])209
||
|Chris StockwellEtobicoke West
|-
|colspan=2 bgcolor=whitesmoke align=center|Merged riding
|-
||
|Doug Ford†Etobicoke—Humber
|-
|bgcolor=whitesmoke|Etobicoke—Lakeshore
||
|Morley Kells20,602
|
|Laurel Broten15,723
|
|Vicki Obedkoff6,457
|
|Kevin McGourty423
|
|Don Jackson 349
|
|
|
|Janice Murray (Ind [M-L])299
||
|Morley Kells
|-
|bgcolor=whitesmoke|Etobicoke North
||
|John Hastings13,065
|
|Shafiq Qaadri11,619
|
|Ed Philip8,166
|
|Mark Stefanini 580
|
|Marilyn Pepper 223
|
|
|
|Diane Johnston (Ind [M-L])489
||
|John HastingsEtobicoke—Rexdale
|-
|bgcolor=whitesmoke|Scarborough—Agincourt
|
|Jim Brown15,915
||
|Gerry Phillips18,698
|
|Bob Frankford1,319
|
|
|
|Ken Morgan 129
|
|Gary Carmichael 451
|
|Wayne Cook (Ind)371
||
|Gerry Philips 
|-
|bgcolor=whitesmoke|Scarborough Centre
||
|Marilyn Mushinski18,189
|
|Costas Manios14,565
|
|Sid Ryan8,399
|
|Rina Morra 573
|
|Eileen Murray 455
|
|
|
|
||
|Marilyn Mushinski Scarborough—Ellesmere
|-
|bgcolor=whitesmoke|Scarborough East
||
|Steve Gilchrist20,686
|
|Peter Vanderyagt17,084
|
|Terry Maley2,853
|
|Catherine Fox 457
|
|Loucas Café 135
|
|
|
|Sam Apelbaum (Lbt)368Heath Thomas (Ind)205
||
|Steve Gilchrist
|-
|bgcolor=whitesmoke|Scarborough—Rouge River
|
|Mubashar Dar12,061
||
|Alvin Curling20,052
|
|Paulette Senior2,138
|
|Betty Peters 489
|
|Lou Dube 284
|
|
|
|
||
|Alvin CurlingScarborough North
|-
|rowspan=3 bgcolor=whitesmoke|Scarborough Southwest
|rowspan=3 |
|rowspan=3|Dan Newman15,349
|rowspan=3|
|rowspan=3|Adrian Heaps12,992
|rowspan=3|
|rowspan=3|Michael Yorke8,962
|rowspan=3|
|rowspan=3|Wiktor Borkowski495
|rowspan=3|
|rowspan=3|Laurence Corp339
|rowspan=3|
|rowspan=3|Barbara Schaefer466
|rowspan=3|
|rowspan=3|
||
|Jim Brown‡Scarborough West
|-
|colspan=2 bgcolor=whitesmoke align=center|Merged riding
|-
||
|Dan NewmanScarborough Centre
|-
|bgcolor=whitesmoke|Willowdale
||
|David Young22,200
|
|Fahimeh Mortazavi18,579
|
|Mikael Swayze1,871
|
|Jim Conrad 409
|
|Claude Viau 75
|
|Elizabeth Rhodes 330
|
|Bernadette Michael (Ind)323Vaughan Byrnes (F)152
||
|Charles Harnick†
|-
|rowspan=3 bgcolor=whitesmoke|York Centre
|rowspan=3|
|rowspan=3|Robert Hausman9,192
|rowspan=3 |
|rowspan=3|Monte Kwinter21,250
|rowspan=3|
|rowspan=3|Norm Jesin3721
|rowspan=3|
|rowspan=3|
|rowspan=3|
|rowspan=3|Angus Hunt 621
|rowspan=3|
|rowspan=3|
|rowspan=3|
|rowspan=3|
||
|Annamarie Castrilli‡ Downsview
|-
|colspan=2 bgcolor=whitesmoke align=center|Merged riding
|-
||
|Monte Kwinter Wilson Heights
|-
|bgcolor=whitesmoke|York West
|
|Chris Collier5,086
||
|Mario Sergio16,457
|
|Stephnie Payne3,377
|
|
|
|Mark Scrafford 299
|
|Anthony Davison 427
|
|Nicholas Lin (Ind [M-L])194Rosemary Ann Ray (Ind [Communist League])149
||
|Mario Sergio Yorkview

Brampton, Mississauga & Oakville

|-
|bgcolor=whitesmoke|Bramalea—Gore—Malton—Springdale
||
|Raminder Gill18,442
|
|Dave Toor14,492
|
|Vishnu Roche2,204
|
|
|
|Roy Willis (Ind)2,206
|colspan="2" style="text-align:center;"|New District
|-
|bgcolor=whitesmoke|Brampton Centre
||
|Joe Spina20,623
|
|Gurjit Grewal9,994
|
|Paul Schmidt5080
|
|
|
|
||
|Joe SpinaBrampton North
|-
|bgcolor=whitesmoke|Brampton West—Mississauga
||
|Tony Clement24,909
|
|Vic Dhillon16,599
|
|John Devries2,824
|
|Mei Sze Viau 252
|
|
||
|Tony ClementBrampton South
|-
|bgcolor=whitesmoke|Mississauga Centre
||
|Rob Sampson18,688
|
|George Winter14,572
|
|Gail McCabe1,820
|
|Bob Harringon1,117
|
|
||
|Rob Sampson Mississauga West
|-
|bgcolor=whitesmoke|Mississauga East
||
|Carl DeFaria17,688
|
|Shan Padda13,371
|
|James Kafieh2,484
|
|Greg Mytron 282
|
|Pierre Chenier (Ind [M-L])469
||
|Carl DeFaria
|-
|bgcolor=whitesmoke|Mississauga South
||
|Margaret Marland23,890
|
|Ieva Martin12,275
|
|Ken Cole2,293
|
|
|
|Tim Sullivan (Ind [M-L])535
||
|Margaret Marland
|-
|bgcolor=whitesmoke|Mississauga West
||
|John Snobelen26,816
|
|Bob Delaney17,792
|
|Maxine Caron1,795
|
|Fred Fredeen 387
|
|
||
|John SnobelenMississauga North
|-
|bgcolor=whitesmoke|Oakville
||
|Gary Carr27,767
|
|Kevin Flynn14,689
|
|Sean Cain1,667
|
|Linda Antonichuk202
|
|Adrian Ratelle (FCP)530
||
|Gary CarrOakville South

Hamilton-Wentworth, Burlington & Niagara

|-
|bgcolor=whitesmoke|Burlington
||
|Cam Jackson29,055
|
|Linda Glover14,220
|
|Danny Dunleavy2,167
|
|
|
|Regina Law 144
|
|Bruce Smith432
|
|Anne Marsden (Ind)289
||
|Cam JacksonBurlington South
|-
|bgcolor=whitesmoke|Erie—Lincoln
||
|Tim Hudak20,481
|
|Lorne Boyko14,603
|
|Dave Thomas3,884
|
|Alfred Kiers 1009
|
|John Gregory 435
|
|
|
|
||
|Tim HudakNiagara South
|-
|rowspan="3" bgcolor=whitesmoke|Halton
|rowspan="3" |
|rowspan="3"|Ted Chudleigh35,505
|rowspan="3"|
|rowspan="3"|Mohan Anand14,767
|rowspan="3"|
|rowspan="3"|Jay Jackson2,833
|rowspan="3"|
|rowspan="3"|Giuseppe Gori 755
|rowspan="3"|
|rowspan="3"|
|rowspan="3"|
|rowspan="3"|Bill Champ 806
|rowspan="3"|
|rowspan="3"|
||
|Ted ChudleighHalton North
|-
|colspan=2 bgcolor=whitesmoke align=center|Merged riding
|-
||
|Terence Young† Halton Centre
|-
|bgcolor=whitesmoke|Hamilton East
|
|Peter Preston7,414
||
|Dominic Agostino17,891
|
|Bob Sutton6,304
|
|Edgar Breau 386
|
|Laureen Amos258
|
|Jim Howlett496
|
|Bob Mann (Comm)288Julie Gordon (Ind [M-L])263
||
|Dominic Agostino
|-
|bgcolor=whitesmoke|Hamilton Mountain
|
|Trevor Pettit16,397
||
|Marie Bountrogianni19,076
|
|Chris Charlton10,622
|
|Jim Enos 426
|
|Bob Danio 261
|
|Kelli Gallagher456
|
|Rolf Gerstenberger (Ind [M-L])159
||
|Trevor Pettit
|-
|rowspan="3" bgcolor=whitesmoke|Hamilton West
|rowspan="3"|
|rowspan="3"|Lillian Ross12,261
|rowspan="3"|
|rowspan="3"|Frank D'Amico12,037
|rowspan="3" |
|rowspan="3"|David Christopherson15,625
|rowspan="3"|
|rowspan="3"|Lynne Scime 403
|rowspan="3"|
|rowspan="3"|Rita Rassenberg  231
|rowspan="3"|
|rowspan="3"|Phyllis McColl495
|rowspan="3"|
|rowspan="3"|Wendell Fields (Ind-(ML))236
||
|David ChristophersonHamilton Centre
|-
|colspan=2 bgcolor=whitesmoke align=center|Merged riding
|-
||
|Lillian Ross
|-
|rowspan="3" bgcolor=whitesmoke|Niagara Centre
|rowspan="3"|
|rowspan="3"|Frank Sheehan17,217
|rowspan="3"|
|rowspan="3"|M. Charbonneau9,539
|rowspan="3" |
|rowspan="3"|Peter Kormos21,856
|rowspan="3"|
|rowspan="3"|
|rowspan="3"|
|rowspan="3"|Margaret Larrass 382
|rowspan="3"|
|rowspan="3"|
|rowspan="3"|
|rowspan="3"|Lank Makuloluwa (Ind)198
||
|Peter KormosWelland—Thorold
|-
|colspan=2 bgcolor=whitesmoke align=center|Merged riding
|-
||
|Frank SheehanLincoln
|-
|bgcolor=whitesmoke|Niagara Falls
||
|Bart Maves18,497
|
|Selina Volpatti17,080
|
|Claude Sonier3,985
|
|
|
|Bill Amos 317
|
|Clara Tarnoy 300
|
|Darren Wood (Ind)298
||
|Bart Maves
|-
|rowspan="3" bgcolor=whitesmoke|St. Catharines
|rowspan="3"|
|rowspan="3"|Tom Froese17,994
|rowspan="3" |
|rowspan="3"|Jim Bradley25,186
|rowspan="3"|
|rowspan="3"|Gordon Coggins2,902
|rowspan="3"|
|rowspan="3"|
|rowspan="3"|
|rowspan="3"|Helene Darisse 272
|rowspan="3"|
|rowspan="3"|Doug Woodard 215
|rowspan="3"|
|rowspan="3"|Ron Walker (Ind [M-L])154
||
|Jim Bradley
|-
|colspan=2 bgcolor=whitesmoke align=center|Merged riding
|-
||
|Tom FroeseSt. Catharines—Brock
|-
|bgcolor=whitesmoke|
Stoney Creek
||
|Brad Clark21,462
|
|Chris Phillips18,840
|
|Robert Barlow4,922
|
|Philip Lees 1,206
|
|Sue Marchand 330
|
|
|
|Paul Lane (Ind [M-L])350
||
|Ed Doyle†Wentworth East
|-
|bgcolor=whitesmoke|Wentworth-Burlington
||
|Toni Skarica27,466
|
|Vicky Wylson-Sher15,843
|
|Jessica Brennan3,990
|
|
|
|
|
|
|
|
||
|Toni SkaricaWentworth North

Midwestern Ontario

|-
| bgcolor=whitesmoke|Brant
|
|Alayne Sokoloski20,210
||
|Dave Levac21,166
|
|David Sharpe2,889
|
|
|
|Eleanor Hyodo 294
|
|
|
|Graham McRae (Ind)495
||
|Ron Johnson†Brantford
|-
|bgcolor=whitesmoke|Cambridge
||
|Gerry Martiniuk24,583
|
|Jerry Boyle10,244
|
|Gary Gibson8,684
|
|Al Smith 824
|
|
|
|Kathleen Morton489
|
|
||
|Gerry Martiniuk
|-
|bgcolor=whitesmoke|Guelph—Wellington
||
|Brenda Elliott26,246
|
|Wayne Hyland16,595
|
|Bruce Abel5,907
|
|John Gots 1,020
|
|
|
|Bradley Shaw 733
|
|Anna Di Carlo (Ind [M-L])396
||
|Brenda ElliottGuelph
|-
|rowspan=3 bgcolor=whitesmoke|Haldimand—Norfolk—Brant
|rowspan=3 |
|rowspan=3|Toby Barrett23,124
|rowspan=3|
|rowspan=3|Doug Miller18,304
|rowspan=3|
|rowspan=3|Prue Steiner2,600
|rowspan=3|
|rowspan=3|Barra Gots 584
|rowspan=3|
|rowspan=3|Stefan Larrass 148
|rowspan=3|
|rowspan=3|John Jaques 413
|rowspan=3|
|rowspan=3|
||
|Peter Preston‡  Brant—Haldimand
|-
|colspan=2 bgcolor=whitesmoke align=center|Merged riding
|-
||
|Toby BarrettNorfolk
|-
|rowspan=3 bgcolor=whitesmoke|Huron—Bruce
|rowspan=3 |
|rowspan=3 |Helen Johns20,772
|rowspan=3|
|rowspan=3|Ross Lamont18,993
|rowspan=3|
|rowspan=3|Tony McQuail4,142
|rowspan=3|
|rowspan=3|Linda Freiburger 1494
|rowspan=3|
|rowspan=3|
|rowspan=3|
|rowspan=3|
|rowspan=3|
|rowspan=3|
||
|Helen JohnsHuron
|-
|colspan=2 bgcolor=whitesmoke align=center|Merged riding
|-
||
|Barb Fisher†Bruce
|-
|rowspan=3 bgcolor=whitesmoke|Kitchener Centre
|rowspan=3 |
|rowspan=3|Wayne Wettlaufer22,593
|rowspan=3|
|rowspan=3|Berry Vrbanovic17,984
|rowspan=3|
|rowspan=3|David Brohman3,494
|rowspan=3|
|rowspan=3|
|rowspan=3|
|rowspan=3|Roy Anderson 204
|rowspan=3|
|rowspan=3|Susan Koswan 561
|rowspan=3|
|rowspan=3|Irvine Conner (Ind)109Julian Ichim (Ind [M-L])107
||
|Wayne WettlauferKitchener
|-
|colspan=2 bgcolor=whitesmoke align=center|Merged riding
|-
||
|Gary Leadston†Kitchener—Wilmot
|-
|bgcolor=whitesmoke|Kitchener-Waterloo
||
|Elizabeth Witmer27,830
|
|Sean Strickland18,034
|
|Ted Martin3,122
|
|Lou Reitzel919
|
|Richard Beecroft  135
|
|Judy Greenwood-Speers 836
|
|Matthew Albrecht (Ind [Humanist])202Helmut Braun (Ind [M-L])122
||
|Elizabeth WitmerWaterloo North
|-
|bgcolor=whitesmoke|Oxford
||
|Ernie Hardeman22,726
|
|Brian Brown15,160
|
|Martin Donlevy3,077
|
|Andre De Decker 875
|
|Jim Morris 203
|
|
|
|Kaye Sargent (Lbt)321Paul Blair (F)312
||
|Ernie Hardeman
|-
|bgcolor=whitesmoke|Perth—Middlesex
||
|Bert Johnson22,065
|
|John Wilkinson15,428
|
|Walter Vernon3,053
|
|Pat Bannon 1,369
|
|
|
|
|
|Robert Smink (F)521
||
|Bert JohnsonPerth
|-
|bgcolor=whitesmoke|Waterloo—Wellington
||
|Ted Arnott26,286	
|
|Marion Reidel12,923
|
|R. Walsh-Bowers2,306
|
|Gord Truscott 685
|
|
|
|Brent Bouteiller 566
|
| 
||
|Ted ArnottWellington

Southwestern Ontario

|-
|rowspan="3" bgcolor=whitesmoke|Chatham-Kent—Essex
|rowspan="3"|
|rowspan="3"|Jack Carroll16,238
|rowspan="3" |
|rowspan="3"|Pat Hoy24,239
|rowspan="3"|
|rowspan="3"|Brian Sharp2,316
|rowspan="3"|
|rowspan="3"|
|rowspan="3"|
|rowspan="3"|Greg Zolad 462
|rowspan="3"|
|rowspan="3"|
|rowspan="3"|
|rowspan="3"|
||
|Jack CarrollChatham—Kent
|-
|colspan=2 bgcolor=whitesmoke align=center|Merged riding
|-
||
|Pat HoyEssex—Kent
|-
|rowspan="3" bgcolor=whitesmoke|Elgin—Middlesex—London
|rowspan="3"|
|rowspan="3"|Bruce Smith19,246
|rowspan="3" |
|rowspan="3"|Steve Peters20,417
|rowspan="3"|
|rowspan="3"|Dave LaPointe3,455
|rowspan="3"|
|rowspan="3"|
|rowspan="3"|
|rowspan="3"|John Fisher 391
|rowspan="3"|
|rowspan="3"|Ray Monteith 405
|rowspan="3"|
|rowspan="3"|Corey Janzen (Ind)284
||
|Bruce SmithMiddlesex
|-
|colspan=2 bgcolor=whitesmoke align=center|Merged riding
|-
||
|Peter North†Elgin
|-
|bgcolor=whitesmoke|Essex
|
|Pat O'Neil15,354
||
|Bruce Crozier25,446
|
|Merv Richards3,745
|
|
|
|
|
|
|
|Enver Villamizar (Ind [M-L]) 307
||
|Bruce CrozierEssex South
|-
|bgcolor=whitesmoke|Lambton—Kent—Middlesex
||
|Marcel Beaubien19,561
|
|Larry O'Neill18,665
|
|Jim Lee4,170
|
|
|
|
|
|Wayne Forbes 1076
|
|
||
|Marcel BeaubienLambton
|-
|rowspan="3" bgcolor=whitesmoke|London North Centre
|rowspan="3" |
|rowspan="3"|Dianne Cunningham18,320
|rowspan="3"|
|rowspan="3"|Roger Caranci9,518
|rowspan="3"|
|rowspan="3"|Marion Boyd16,611
|rowspan="3"|
|rowspan="3"|Stephen Porter 120
|rowspan="3"|
|rowspan="3"|Jeff Culbert 366
|rowspan="3"|
|rowspan="3"|Robert Metz 156
|rowspan="3"|
|rowspan="3"|Andrew Jezierski (FCP)466
||
|Dianne CunninghamLondon North
|-
|colspan=2 bgcolor=whitesmoke align=center|Merged riding
|-
||
|Marion BoydLondon Centre
|-
|bgcolor=whitesmoke|London—Fanshawe
||
|Frank Mazzilli15,295
|
|Peter Mancini13,912
|
|Irene Mathyssen9,788
|
|Heidi Strasser 241
|
|Wanda Beaver 172
|
|Lloyd Walker 293
|
|
| style="text-align:center;" colspan=2 |New District
|-
|bgcolor=whitesmoke|London West
||
|Bob Wood22,761
|
|Darrel Skidmore22,467
|
|Sandra McNee4,628
|
|Ernie Merkley 133
|
|Jeremy Price 308
|
|Jack Plant 236
|
|Gayle Remisch (Lbt)133
||
|Bob WoodLondon South
|-
|bgcolor=whitesmoke|Sarnia—Lambton
|
|Dave Boushy16,679
||
|Caroline Di Cocco19,440
|
|Mark Kotanen3,110
|
|
|
|
|
|Andrew Falby 517
|
|
||
|Dave BoushySarnia
|-
|rowspan="3" bgcolor=whitesmoke|Windsor—St. Clair
|rowspan="3"|
|rowspan="3"|Mike Rohrer7,241
|rowspan="3" |
|rowspan="3"|Dwight Duncan17,383
|rowspan="3"|
|rowspan="3"|Wayne Lessard13,171
|rowspan="3"|
|rowspan="3"|Janet Shorten 159
|rowspan="3"|
|rowspan="3"|Darren J. Brown 339
|rowspan="3"|
|rowspan="3"|
|rowspan="3"|
|rowspan="3"|Ralph Kirchner (Ind)263
||
|Dwight DuncanWindsor—Walkerville
|-
|colspan=2 bgcolor=whitesmoke align=center|Merged riding
|-
||
|Wayne LessardWindsor—Riverside
|-
|bgcolor=whitesmoke|Windsor West
|
|David McCamon6,229
||
|Sandra Pupatello24,388
|
|Liam McCarthy5,762
|
|Lynn Tobin 162
|
|Timothy Dugdale 420
|
|
|
|Robert Cruise (Ind [M-L])270
||
|Sandra PupatelloWindsor—Sandwich

Northern Ontario

|-
|rowspan="3" bgcolor=whitesmoke|Algoma—Manitoulin
|rowspan="3"|
|rowspan="3"|Keith Currie8,617
|rowspan="3" |
|rowspan="3"|Mike Brown14,299
|rowspan="3"|
|rowspan="3"|Lynn Watson8,780
|rowspan="3"|
|rowspan="3"|Graham Hearn (Lbt)425
||
|Mike Brown
|-
|colspan=2 bgcolor=whitesmoke align=center|Merged riding
|-
||
|Bud Wildman†Algoma
|-
|rowspan="3" bgcolor=whitesmoke|Kenora—Rainy River
|rowspan="3"|
|rowspan="3"|Lynn Beyak5,483
|rowspan="3"|
|rowspan="3"|Frank Miclash11,209
|rowspan="3" |
|rowspan="3"|Howard Hampton14,269
|rowspan="3"|
|rowspan="3"|Richard Bruyere (Ind)934
||
|Frank MiclashKenora
|-
|colspan=2 bgcolor=whitesmoke align=center|Merged riding
|-
||
|Howard HamptonRainy River
|-
|rowspan="3" bgcolor=whitesmoke|Nickel Belt
|rowspan="3"|
|rowspan="3"|Gerry Courtemanche10,359
|rowspan="3"|
|rowspan="3"|Ron Dupuis10,165
|rowspan="3" |
|rowspan="3"|Shelley Martel14,833
|rowspan="3"|
|rowspan="3"|
||
|Blain Morin†
|-
|colspan=2 bgcolor=whitesmoke align=center|Merged riding
|-
||
|Shelley MartelSudbury East
|-
|bgcolor=whitesmoke|Nipissing
||
|Mike Harris19,498
|
|George Maroosis16,682
|
|Wendy Young1,878
|
|Jaimie Board (G)366Michaele Morris (NLP)246
||
|Mike Harris
|-
|rowspan="3" bgcolor=whitesmoke|Parry Sound—Muskoka
|rowspan="3" |
|rowspan="3"|Ernie Eves22,967
|rowspan="3"|
|rowspan="3"|Isabel Doxey10,970
|rowspan="3"|
|rowspan="3"|Dan Waters5,343
|rowspan="3"|
|rowspan="3"|Iris Tamssot (NLP)339
||
|Ernie EvesParry Sound
|-
|colspan=2 bgcolor=whitesmoke align=center|Merged riding
|-
||
|Bill Grimmett†Muskoka—Georgian Bay
|-
|bgcolor=whitesmoke|Sault Ste. Marie
|
|James Caicco10,477
|
|Terry Sheehan10,180
||
|Tony Martin15,949
|
|Colleen Hibbs (NLP)288
||
|Tony Martin
|-
|bgcolor=whitesmoke|Sudbury
|
|Mila Wong10,948
||
|Rick Bartolucci21,732
|
|Paul Chislett3,891
|
|Bernard Fram (NLP)184Ed Pokonzie (Ind)159David Popescu (Ind)103
||
|Rick Bartolucci
|-
|bgcolor=whitesmoke|Thunder Bay—Atikokan
|
|John Henderson6,081
||
|Lyn McLeod20,268
|
|Jack Drewes5,304
|
|
||
|Lyn McLeodFort William
|-
|rowspan="3" bgcolor=whitesmoke|Thunder Bay—Superior North
|rowspan="3"|
|rowspan="3"|Ed Linkewich5,683
|rowspan="3" |
|rowspan="3"|Michael Gravelle19,249
|rowspan="3"|
|rowspan="3"|Nathalie Galesloot5,864
|rowspan="3"|
|rowspan="3"|Robert Woito (Ind)431Carl Rose (G)382
||
|Michael GravellePort Arthur
|-
|colspan=2 bgcolor=whitesmoke align=center|Merged riding
|-
||
|Gilles Pouliot†Lake Nipigon
|-
|rowspan="3" bgcolor=whitesmoke|Timiskaming—Cochrane
|rowspan="3"|
|rowspan="3"|Rick Brassard10,374
|rowspan="3" |
|rowspan="3"|David Ramsay16,877
|rowspan="3"|
|rowspan="3"|Len Wood7,631
|rowspan="3"|
|rowspan="3"|
||
|David RamsayTimiskaming
|-
|colspan=2 bgcolor=whitesmoke align=center|Merged riding
|-
||
|Len WoodCochrane North
|-
|bgcolor=whitesmoke|Timmins—James Bay
|
|Marcel Pelchat4,139
|
|Yves Malette10,238
||
|Gilles Bisson16,504
|
|Ed Walsh (Ind)316
||
|Gilles BissonCochrane South

By-elections
Six by-elections were held between the 1999 and 2003 elections.

|-
| style="background:whitesmoke;"|Ancaster—Dundas—Flamborough—AldershotSeptember 7, 2000
||
|Ted McMeekin19,916
|
|Priscilla de Villiers10,201
|
|Jessica Brennan2,297
|
|Mark Coakley903
|
|John Turmel (Ind)80
||
|Toni Skarica
|-
| style="background:whitesmoke;"|Parry Sound—MuskokaFebruary 8, 2001
|
|Evelyn Brown8,979
||
|Norm Miller12,903
|
|Joanne Bury888
|
|Richard Thomas3,229
|
|Anne Marsden (Ind)113John Turmel (Ind)61
||
|Ernie Eves
|-
| style="background:whitesmoke;"|Vaughan—King—AuroraJune 28, 2001
||
|Greg Sorbara21,961
|
|Joyce Frustaglio12,172
|
|Mike Seward708
|
|Ernst Von Bezold752
|
|Rina Morra (FCP)267
||
|Al Palladini
|-
| style="background:whitesmoke;"|Beaches—East YorkSeptember 20, 2001
|
|Robert Hunter10,289
|
|Mac Penney2,821
||
|Michael Prue14,024
|
|Peter Elgie694
|
|Ray Scott (FCP)206Vince Corriere (Ind)59Dan King (Ind)51
||
|Frances Lankin
|-
| style="background:whitesmoke;"|NipissingMay 2, 2002
|
|George Maroosis13,970
||
|Al McDonald13,989
|
|Wendy Young1,821
|
|Todd Lucier940
|
|
||
|Mike Harris
|-
| style="background:whitesmoke;"|Dufferin—Peel—Wellington—GreyMay 2, 2002
|
|Josh Matlow11,728
||
|Ernie Eves15,288
|
|Doug Wilcox2,633
|
|Richard Procter2,017
|
|Dave Davies (FCP)1,025John Turmel (Ind)120
||
|David Tilson
|}

See also

Politics of Ontario
Independent candidates, 1999 Ontario provincial election
Independent Marxist–Leninist candidates, 1999 Ontario provincial election
List of Ontario political parties
Premier of Ontario
Leader of the Opposition (Ontario)
 Natural Law Party candidates, 1999 Ontario provincial election

1999 elections in Canada
1999
1999 in Ontario
June 1999 events in Canada